Turtle Lake Township is the name of some places in the U.S. state of Minnesota:
Turtle Lake Township, Beltrami County, Minnesota
Turtle Lake Township, Cass County, Minnesota

Minnesota township disambiguation pages